The Rogers Best Canadian Film Award is presented annually by the Toronto Film Critics Association to the film judged by the organization's members as the year's best Canadian film. In 2012, the cash prize accompanying the award was increased to $100,000, making it the largest arts award in Canada. Each year, two runners-up also receive $5,000. The award is funded and presented by Rogers Communications, which is a founding sponsor of the association's awards gala.

Unlike the other Toronto Film Critics Association awards, whose winners are announced in early January each year, the Best Canadian Film award only has its finalists announced at that time, and the winner of the award is then announced at the organization's gala in March.

Toronto Film Critics Poll
Prior to the official launch of the Toronto Film Critics Association in 1997, film critic Wyndham Wise coordinated two polls of Toronto film critics in 1995 and 1996 through his magazine Take One to select the year's best Canadian films; upon the launch of the TFCA, this poll was discontinued and superseded by the TFCA's annual awards.

1995

1996

Toronto Film Critics Association

1990s

2000s

2010s

2020s

References

Toronto Film Critics Association Awards
Rogers Communications